The Corvinus String Quartet is a renowned Budapest based string quartet.
It was founded in 2003 when its members were students of the Liszt Ference Music Academy and members of the Danubia national youth symphony orchestra.
All members have shown great results in international competitions as soloists and are active as a string quartet.
Having studied under Hargitai & Perenyi, they succeeded in many concerts in Budapest and other major cities in Hungary.
In 2005 they were invited to the Young Prague Festival at the Czech Republic. In 2005 and 2006 they had performed in the Budapest Spring Festival and in 2007 the quartet was invited for a concert tour in Tokyo, Japan. The quartet's playing is dynamic and full of young spirit.

Members 
 Emese Gulyas, violin
 Lugosi Veronika, violin
 Katona Dora, cello

External links
 Corvinus String Quartet (Vonósnégyes) Official site

Hungarian string quartets